Barney Norris,  (born 1987) is a British writer.

Early life
Norris was born in Chichester in West Sussex, later moving to Wiltshire where he attended Bishop Wordsworth's School, Salisbury. He read English at Keble College, Oxford, and creative writing at Royal Holloway, University of London.

Career
After leaving university, he set up the touring Up in Arms Theatre Company with the director Alice Hamilton, and worked in the theatre as assistant to Thelma Holt, Michael Frayn, Peter Gill and Max Stafford-Clark, before becoming a full-time writer. He is an associate artist at the Watermill Theatre, teaches creative writing at the University of Oxford and writes regularly in the national press, including book reviews for the Guardian.

Writing
Norris's early plays were produced by his company Up in Arms, usually on tour and often in partnership with other theatres. Following the success of his first full-length play Visitors, he began to write for other companies, and has since worked with Salisbury Playhouse, the Bush Theatre, Oxford Playhouse, the Arcola Theatre, the Royal and Derngate, Out of Joint and the Bridge Theatre, among others. His first novel, Five Rivers Met on a Wooded Plain, was published in 2016; he has since published three other novels, including Undercurrent in 2022, and two books of non-fiction.

Awards
 2014 – Critics' Circle Award for Most Promising Playwright for Visitors
 2015 – Selected as one of the Evening Standard's Progress 1000
 2016 – Betty Trask Award for Five Rivers Met on a Wooded Plain
 2016 – South Bank Sky Arts Times Breakthrough Award for Literature
 2018 – One Book Award for Turning For Home
 2018 – Elected a Fellow of the Royal Society of Literature
 2019 – Award for Excellence in International Theatre from the International Theatre Institute

Selected works

Fiction

 Five Rivers Met on a Wooded Plain (2016)
 Turning For Home (2018)
 The Vanishing Hours (2019)
 Undercurrent (2022)

Theatre

 Visitors (2014, Up in Arms, Arcola Theatre, Bush Theatre and tour)
 Eventide (2015, Up in Arms, Arcola Theatre and tour)
 Echo's End (2017, Salisbury Playhouse)
 While We're Here (2017, Up in Arms, Bush Theatre, BBC Radio 4 and tour)
 Nightfall (2018, Bridge Theatre)
 We Started To Sing (2022, Arcola Theatre)

Adaptations

 The Remains of the Day (2019, Out of Joint, Northampton Royal and Derngate, Oxford Playhouse and tour)
 Blood Wedding (2020, Up in Arms and Salisbury Playhouse)

Collaborations

 The Wellspring with David Owen Norris (2022, Northampton Royal and Derngate and tour)

Radio

 While We're Here (2018, BBC Radio 4)
 Song and Dance (2019, BBC Radio 4)
 The Queen of the Isle of Wight (2021, BBC Radio 4)

Non-fiction

 To Bodies Gone: The Theatre of Peter Gill (2014)
 The Wellspring: Conversations with David Owen Norris (2018)

References

External links
Official website

Living people
1987 births
Alumni of Keble College, Oxford
Alumni of Royal Holloway, University of London
21st-century British dramatists and playwrights
21st-century British novelists
Fellows of the Royal Society of Literature
People from Chichester
People from Wiltshire
British male novelists